Scotty Ray Davison (born October 16, 1970) is an American former professional baseball pitcher for the Seattle Mariners of Major League Baseball (MLB) (–). 

Davison attended Redondo Union High School, in Redondo Beach, California, graduating in 1988.

In , he played for the Chiba Lotte Marines of the Nippon Professional Baseball (NPB). In , he played for the independent St. George Pioneerzz of the Western Baseball League and the Tampa Bay Devil Rays' Triple-A affiliate, the Durham Bulls.

External links

1970 births
Living people
American expatriate baseball players in Canada
American expatriate baseball players in Japan
Appleton Foxes players
Baseball players from Inglewood, California
Bellingham Mariners players
Calgary Cannons players
Chiba Lotte Marines players
Durham Bulls players
Gulf Coast Expos players
Jamestown Expos players
Major League Baseball pitchers
Nippon Professional Baseball pitchers
Port City Roosters players
Rockford Expos players
Seattle Mariners players
St. George Pioneerzz players
Tacoma Rainiers players
West Palm Beach Expos players